Channel 8 or TV 8 may refer to

Television networks, channels and stations
 Channel 8 (Israel), a television channel in Israel; see List of television channels in Israel
 Channel 8 (Singaporean TV channel), a Chinese-language television channel in Singapore
 Channel 8 (Thai TV channel), a television channel in Thailand
 TV8 (Estonia), a television channel in Estonia
 TV8 (Italian TV channel), a television channel in Italy
 TV8 (Lithuanian TV channel), a terrestrial, satellite and cable television channel
 TV8 (Moldovan TV channel), a television channel in Moldova
 TV8 (Mongolian TV channel), a television channel in Mongolia
 TV8 (Swedish TV channel), a Swedish news channel
 TV8 (Turkish TV channel), a Turkish television channel
 Canal 8 de Tucumán, a television station in San Miguel de Tucumán, Argentina
 CBC TV 8 (Barbados), the national broadcaster of Barbados
 NewsChannel 8 (cable channel), a regional cable television network in Washington, District of Columbia
 TVB8, a commercial television station in Hong Kong
 Canal 8 UCV TV, a Chilean television channel, 1974–2002
Ágape TV (Canal 8), a Salvadoran television channel
 Fuji Television, a Japanese television station
 Trojan Vision, the student-run television station at the University of Southern California
 Unicanal a Paraguayan pay televisión channel exclusive in TigoStar vía Channel 8 in Asunción.
 TV8 (Norway), a television channel in Norway replaced by Fox Crime (Norway)
 Canal 8 Sport, a former television channel in Denmark
 Television Nacional, a defunct network in Guatemala

Other uses
 TV8 (magazine), a French language weekly magazine about television programming, published by Ringier in Switzerland
 Channel Ocho, a fictitious Spanish-language station on The Simpsons
 "Channel 8", a fictional competing broadcaster to "U-62 in UHF (film)

See also
 8tv (disambiguation)
 Channel 8 branded TV stations in the United States
 Channel 8 virtual TV stations in Canada
 Channel 8 virtual TV stations in Mexico
 Channel 8 virtual TV stations in the United States

For VHF frequencies covering 180–186 MHz:

 Channel 8 TV stations in Canada
 Channel 8 TV stations in Mexico
 Channel 8 digital TV stations in the United States
 Channel 8 low-power TV stations in the United States

08